Pau Ribes Culla (born 1 September 1995) is a Spanish synchronised swimmer.

He won a bronze medal in the mixed free routine competition at the 2018 European Aquatics Championships.

Notes

References

1995 births
Living people
Spanish synchronized swimmers
Male synchronized swimmers
World Aquatics Championships medalists in synchronised swimming
Synchronized swimmers at the 2015 World Aquatics Championships
Artistic swimmers at the 2019 World Aquatics Championships
European Aquatics Championships medalists in synchronised swimming
Artistic swimmers at the 2022 World Aquatics Championships